Holy Week in Málaga (in Spanish Semana Santa en Málaga), is the annual commemoration of the Passion of Jesus in Málaga, Spain. It takes place during the last week of Lent, the week immediately before Easter. It is one of the city's main cultural and religious events.

During Holy Week, 42 brotherhoods (cofradía) make 45 processions through the streets of Málaga showing realistic wooden sculptures that depict scenes from the Passion, or images of the Virgin Mary showing sorrow.

Holy Week in Málaga was declared in 1965 to be a Fiesta of International Tourist Interest of Spain.

Procession

Nazareno
In common with other Holy Week events in Spain, some participants in the procession use a nazareno or penitential robe. This garment consists of a tunic, a capirote (hood with conical tip) used to conceal the face of the wearer, and sometimes a cloak. The fabrics normally used in these garments are velvet, damask, satin or twill.  The nazarenos of some brotherhoods also include gloves, scapulars, stoles and a tunic fastened with a cincture made of esparto. The exact colors and forms of the robes depend on the particular brotherhood; in the Málaga procession, their colors are different in the sections of Christ and the Virgin. Usually, the nazarenos carry candles and go in front of the thrones at the leading segments.

Emblem
The majority of the brotherhoods carry a significant number of insignia in the procession that are carried by nazarenos:
Cross guide (the so-called Cruz de Guía - Guiding Cross) is carried at the beginning of each procession and is responsible for guiding it.
 Banner (the so-called Guión) is an emblem of the cofradía in the form of a folded flag, that carries in the center of the flag embroidered in thread of gold and silk the shield or arms of the brotherhood.
 Senatus is the name with which it is known to an emblem that serves to recall the time of the Roman Empire, the period wherein the events of the Passion of Jesus Christ are set. It bears the letters SPQR, which is an acronym for the Latin expression Senatus Populus Que Romanus (Senate and people of Rome).
 Book of Rules (in Spanish Libro de Reglas) is a book that contains the norms and rules of the Brotherhood.

 Standard (the so-called Estandarte) is an insignia, sometimes embroidered in gold thread and luxuriously decorated,  with a painting of the Christ or Virgin of each brotherhood.

Mantilla
Some processions are accompanied by women who wear mantillas. It is formed by a black dress, a sign of mourning and pains, is accompanied by a mantilla, lace or silk veil or shawl worn over the head and back. The peineta, similar in appearance to a large comb, is used to hold up the mantilla.

Acolyte
Before the throne are placed a group of six or eight acolytes dressed in vestments, many of them wearing dalmatics; the ceroferarios who carries the ciriales or processional candlestick; and the thurifers who carries the thurible where incense is burned and it is dispersed.

Throne
The thrones, in others places called pasos, are enormous platforms where are located the sculptures that depict different scenes from the gospels related to the Passion of Christ or the Sorrows of Virgin Mary. Each brotherhood usually exhibit two thrones, the first one would be a sculpted scene of the Passion, or image of Christ; and the second an image of the Virgin Mary, known as a dolorosa.

From the front, back and sides of the canopy hang the bambalinas, velvet or mesh draperies embroidered in gold, plate and silk. In front of the image of the Virgin is placed the candelería, a set of candlesticks which are placed in a stepped layout.

Thrones are carried on the shoulders of men and women, called men of thrones or bearers, through long bars or beams called varales, which usually measure between 8 and 14 meters long. Each throne has 6 or 8 varales depending on the size of the throne. Depending on weight, some can weigh up to 5 tonnes, a throne requires between 120 and 270 portadores (bearers) to move. Each person can carry between 20 and 40 kilograms of weight, during the time of the procession, from 6 to 14 hours.

At the front of the throne's varales there is a big bell. This is rung with a hammer by the Throne Butler (the chief of the Throne Men) to guide and stop to rest the bearers.

Sculpture
The sculptures are located at the top of the throne and are the central axis of each brotherhood, most of the sculptures are carved wood (or recently, polychrome), often life-size or somewhat smaller. Some of these carvings are great works of art with centuries of antiquity, although unfortunately during the burning of churches and convents in the 1931 riots, a great number of these sculptures were destroyed, between them the great majority of works of Pedro de Mena. After the Civil War, authors such as Mariano Benlliure, Francisco Palma Burgos, Castillo Lastrucci or José Navas Parejo began to make new sculptures to replace the destroyed works.

These sculptures are in their respective churches and chapels during the rest of the year where they receive worship.

The images of Jesus are situated on the first throne, which represents a biblical passage of the Gospels: triumphal entry into Jerusalem, Jesus carrying the cross, Jesus crucified, descent from the Cross, etc. Depending on the scene depicted the carving of Jesus may appear alone or accompanied by other statues related to the biblical passage. Some images of Christ wear tunics, smooth or richly embroidered over much of its surface.

In the second throne is located the Virgin of Sorrow, mostly alone but sometimes accompanied by sculpture St. John the Evangelist. The statue of the Virgin usually is of a mannequin, with only the hands and the head carved. The body and arms are covered with luxurious dresses embroidered with gold and silver thread as well as colored silks. Around the head is placed a veil and usually carry a crown or halo. In the back is placed long capes embroidered in gold and silver thread and taking forms that are generally inspired by vegetable motifs, in Malaga these capes can reach up to 8 meters in length.

Music
Bands
Most of the thrones are accompanied by marching bands. Each procession usually has 3 bands, the first band, a drum and bugle band is located behind the lead cross. The second band walks behind the first float, this band is usually of bugles and drums, military band or concert band with woodwind instrument, brass instrument and percussion. Finally, the throne of the virgin is only accompanied by a concert band. Many of these bands are created by the brotherhoods themselves, a few being made up of personnel of the Armed Forces.

These bands play processional marches during processions, most of these marches have been created to accompany the movement of the thrones. It is a tradition that the Marcha Real is played at the departure and entrance of the images in the home churches or chapels of the confraternities and once it is played, everyone pays respect to the anthem (military, police and fire personnel out of formation salute when it is performed).

Saeta
As throughout the Spanish world, and especially in Andalucia, during the processions saetas are sung to the sculptures. The saeta is a religious song, generally improvised and without accompaniment, which is usually sung from a balcony or on the street. It is a melody of free and full of lyricism. It recalls the style of cante jondo typical of the musical tradition of flamenco.

The Route

Brotherhood house
This is the place from which the great majority of the corporations begin their processional route, because the dimensions of the thrones do not allow them to begin the procession at their associated churches.

It is also where they keep the heritage throughout the year, occupying many positions in their museum during the rest of the year.

Official Route

In Holy Week, the official route is made up of those streets that share each and every one of the brotherhoods.

During Holy Week, the brotherhoods of Málaga leave their temple or brotherhood' house, to go to the official route that begins in the Alameda Principal and follows the Larios roundabout, Marqués de Larios street, Constitution Square and Granada street. This route has a distance of about 850 meters. After this route, the brotherhoods continue their own journey returning to their brotherhood or temples of origin, or enter the Cathedral to establish their penitence station.

The Association of Holy Brotherhoods of Malaga places on the official route around 16,000 chairs and several grandstands, among which the Constitution Square Grandstand stands out among the rest, as it is where the city mayor and members of the city council are assembled to witness the procession of the images.

The Rostrum of the Poor
At the end of Carretería Street from Málaga, at the confluence with the Santa Isabel Hall, there is a staircase which at Holy Week becomes a natural tribune to witness the processions of Malaga. Some brotherhoods are expected there with great enthusiasm and popular fervor. It is called this because it is free and in contrast to the Official Rostrum, located in Constitution Square where the authorities are sat.

Of the 45 processions participating in Holy Week, 28 pass through this place.

Cathedral
Some brotherhoods make a penitential station inside the Cathedral of Malaga. There are 15 cofradías that enter the Cathedral. The remaining corporations do not station in the Cathedral due essentially to the large size of their thrones, which prevents them from entering the Cathedral thru the main gates.

Previous Days

Procession
Prior to Holy Week, especially the Friday of Sorrows and the Saturday of Passion, some brotherhoods make processions.  These brotherhoods are usually historical confraternities of neighborhoods very far from the center, as the Brotherhood of the Sorrows from Puerto de la Torre or Brotherhood of the Sorrows from Churriana, or young brotherhoods that still do not belong to the Brotherhood' Association, so even they can not go through the official route.

Transfers
The transfers are small processions in which usually only one throne of reduced dimensions which carry the two sculptures of the brotherhood. They aim to move the statues of their temple to the Brotherhood' House. They usually take place the week before Holy Week, although some brotherhoods carry out during Holy Week.

Some of these transfers are well known and awaited with great expectation, such as that of Jesus Captive who visits the patients of the Civil Hospital or the Christ of the Good Death on the morning of Holy Thursday made by the Legion, they arrive by boat to the port of Málaga, from there they move to the Church of Santo Domingo to transfer the Christ of the Good Death to his throne, which is in the brotherhood' house next to the church.

The Days of Holy Week 
During the days of Holy Week, 41 brotherhoods, belonging to the Brotherhoods Association, carry out 45 penitential processions through the streets of Malaga, the following list shows these cofradías by day and order of passage by the official route.

Palm Sunday 
The first day of the Holy Week is also the day that more brotherhoods process, nine brotherhoods take the street from different neighborhoods of the city.
 Brotherhood of Pollinica (Cofradía de la Pollinica). Beginning at 10 o'clock in the morning with the departure of Our Father Jesus at His Entrance in Jerusalem and Our Lady of Amparo, traditionally known as the "Pollinica". It was founded in 1911 and represents the moment of Jesus at his triumphal entry into Jerusalem. It is the brotherhood that has increased participation of children, their presence a signal that Holy Week has begun.
 Virgin of Tears and Favors. (Virgen de Lagrimas y Favores).  An hour later from the Church of San Juan, the Virgin of Tears and Favors, belonging to the Real Merged Brotherhoods, will take to the street, in this procession, actor Antonio Banderas participates as a Throne Butler. His presence in recent years makes this procession one of the more covered by the press.
Brotherhood of Humility and Patience . (Hermandad de Humildad y Paciencia).  From the neighborhood of Cruz de Humilladero processions for 10 hours the brotherhood of Our Father Jesus of Humility and Patience, represents the moment before the crucifixion in which Jesus retires to pray while preparing the cross, and Our Lady of Sorrows and Hope.
Brotherhood of the Humility (Hermandad de la Humildad). The brotherhood performs its processional from Sanctuary of Santa María de la Victoria. It represents the moment in which Pontius Pilate utters the words Ecce homo when he presents a scourged Jesus Christ, bound and crowned with thorns to a hostile crowd shortly.
Archconfraternity of Prayer in the Garden (Archicofradía de la Oración en el Huerto). It is the oldest brotherhood of the day, founded in 1756. The statues are Our Father Jesus Praying in the Garden, which shows Jesus praying in the Garden of Gethsemane, and Our Lady of the Conception.
Brotherhood of Health (Hermandad de la Salud). Leaves the Church of San Pablo, in the neighbourhood known as La Trinidad. The statues shows Holy Christ of Hope in his Great Love just after his crucifixion and another one of Holy Mary of Health.
Brotherhood of the Sweet Name (Hermandad del Dulce Nombre). Coming from the neighborhood of Capuchinos, The sculptural group of Our Father Jesus of Solitude symbolizes the denials of Peter while the cock crows. Behind it is the throne of the Virgin of the Sweet Name.
Brotherhood of Salutation (Hermandad de Salutación). This brotherhood starts from San Felipe Neri Church, Jesus of Nazareth of the Salutation represents the moment in which Jesus, in his way to Calvary, meets with the women and Veronica and she gave him her veil that he might wipe his forehead.
Brotherhood of Catch (Hermandad del Prendimiento). The other brotherhood of the day of the neighborhood of Capuchinos, Jesus of the Catch has its throne representing the moment of the arrest of Jesus and the kiss of Judas. In the second throne is placed the Virgin of the Great Pardon.

Holy Monday 
In Holy Monday, six brotherhoods procession through the streets of Malaga.
Brotherhood of the Crucifixion (Hermandad de la Crucifixión). It is the youngest brotherhood of the day being founded in 1977. The sculptures are Christ of the Crucifixion, shows the moment in which he having been crucified, the Romans proceed to the distribution and lottery of their clothes, while Dismas and Gestas await their execution, and Holy Mary of Sorrow in her Solitude.
Brotherhood of the Gypsies (Hermandad de los Gitanos), The brotherhood of Our Father Jesus at the Column and Holy Mary of Hope is known as The Gypsies by the number of gypsies who go back as devotees singing and dancing flamenco.
Brotherhood of Sorrows of the Bridge (Cofradía de los Dolores del Puente) The Christ of Pardon represents the moment when Jesus says to the Good Thief, "Amen I say to you today you will be with me in Paradise". The Virgin of the Sorrows of the Bridge is a carving of the 18th century and is called that way because her chapel is next to the Bridge of the Germans.
Archconfraternity of Passion (Archicofradía de Pasión). It leaves from the Church of the Holy Martyrs. The sculpture of Jesus of the Passion represents Jesus carrying the cross helped by Simon of Cyrene, is one of the most notable pieces of Luis Ortega Bru. Behind the throne of the Virgin of Sorrowful Love.
Brotherhood of Students (Hermandad de los Estudiantes) The Brotherhood of Holy Christ Crowned with Thorns and Our Lady of Grace and Hope is the procession that more Nazarenos participate. This brotherhood is linked to the University of Málaga. The Gaudeamus igitur is chanting for the bearers as they carry the Christ during the trip.
Brotherhood of the Captive (Cofradía del Cautivo). Depart from the neighborhood of La Trinidad. Jesus the Captive, known as the Lord of Málaga, is one of the most devotional sculpture of the city. Every year thousands of people march behind as devotees. Behind it is the Virgin of the Trinity, who also has a lot of devotion.

Holy Tuesday 
Six other brotherhoods participate in this day in the processions parades through the streets of Malaga.
Brotherhood of Rocío (Hermandad del Rocío). It comes from the neighborhood of the Victory. The brotherhood of Our Father Jesus of Nazareth of the Steps in Mount Calvary and Holy Mary of Rocio, who is known as the Bride of Malaga, is one of the popular of all the holy week. The statue of Jesus represent one of the three falls while carrying the cross.
Brotherhood of the Pains (Hermandad de las Penas). On the first throne, the Christ of the Agony represents the moments before his death on the cross. The Virgin of the Penas is known for the cape of flowers that she carried made by the gardeners of the Town Council.
Brotherhood of the New Hope (Hermandad de Nueva Esperanza). From the neighborhood of New Málaga leaves the brotherhood with the longest route of Holy Week, with 14 hours of route. The sculptures are Jesus of the Pardón, Jesus carrying the cross, and the Virgin of New Hope.
Brotherhood of the Star (Hermandad de la Estrella). This brotherhood is formed by Jesus of Humiliation, represents the moment of Herod's contempt and Our Lady of the Star, being a sculpture of the 18th century.
Brotherhood of Rescue (Hermandad del Rescate) The second brotherhood of the day from the Victory district. Jesus of the Rescue represents the Arrest of Jesus in the Garden of Gethsemane. The second statue corresponds to the Virgin of Grace. Both sculptures are the work of Castillo Lastrucci.
Brotherhood of Sentence (Hermandad de la Sentencia). The last brotherhood of the day is formed by Our Father Jesus of the Sentence, showing Pilate's court, and Our Lady of the Rosary in her Sorrowful Mysteries.

Holy Wednesday 
This day some of the oldest and most traditional brotherhoods participate in the processions. 7 brotherhoods with 15 thrones in total take the streets of the city.

Brotherhood of the Mediatrix (Hermandad de la Mediadora). It is one of the cofradías with the longest route, being also the last to join the Association of Confraternities. The sculptures Our Father Jesus of Nazareth Redeemer of the World and Our Lady the Mediatrix of Salvation.
Brotherhood of Salesians (Hermandad de Salesianos). This brotherhood is one of the few with a single throne, Holy Christ of Sorrows and Our Lady of Help represents the moment when Jesus crucified in the presence of his own mother and of John the Apostle, said to his mother "Woman, behold your son" and he said to the disciple, "Behold your mother".
Royal Merged Brotherhood (Reales Cofradías Fusionadas). Depart from the church of San Juan, this brotherhood brings to the street 4 thrones. The first with the Jesus statue of Whips and Columns, shows the moment of flagellation of Christ. The next corresponds to the Christ of Exaltation, represents Jesus at the time of the raising of the Holy Cross in the Golgotha. The third throne carried the sculpture of the Christ of the Souls of the Blind was made in 1649 by the sculptor Pedro de Zayas representing Jesus died on the Cross, it is accompanied by the Paratrooper Brigade. The last sculpture corresponds to the Virgin of the Major Sorrow. 
Brotherhood of the Dove (Hermandad de la Paloma). The Virgin of the Dove is carried by 280 bearers on one of the heaviest thrones. Throughout the procession hundreds of pigeons fly around the throne. The first statue, Jesus of the Bridge, represents the moment when Jesus, after being caught in the Garden of Olives is taken to the house of Annas, passing through a stream called Kidron.
Brotherhood of Jesus "The Rich" (Cofradía de Jesús "El Rico") Our Father Jesus "El Rico" represents Jesus carrying the cross. Each year, since the mid-18th century, the brotherhood releases a prisoner, ceremony that was established by Carlos III. The other sculpture corresponds to the Virgin of Love.
Archconfraternity of the Blood (Archicofradía de la Sangre). It is the oldest brotherhood of the Holy Week of Malaga, founded in 1507. The sculptural group of the Christ of the Blood represents the moment when Longinus pierced Jesus in his side with a lance. In the second throne, the Virgin of Consolation and Tears.
Archconfraternity of Expiration (Archicofradía de la Expiración). The Christ of Expiration is a masterpiece of Mariano Benlliure, representing the Last Breath of Christ. Behind it is the Virgin of Sorrows, carried on one of the heaviest thrones of Holy Week. The Civil Guard accompanies the parade.

Maundy Thursday 
Holy Thursday is another day where some of the most popular and historic brotherhoods take part. 8 brotherhoods participate this day.

Brotherhood of the Holy Cross (Hermandad de la Santa Cruz). The first procession is the brotherhood of Santa Cruz, which begins at 15:00 from the Church of San Felipe Neri. It only has a throne, Our Lady of Sorrows in her Protection and Mercy.
 Brotherhood of the Holy Supper (Hermandad de la Sagrada Cena). The first throne represents the Last Supper of Jesus with his apostles, being one of the heaviest thrones of Christ of the Holy Week. In the second throne is located the Virgin of Peace.
Brotherhood of Vineyards (Hermandad de Viñeros). This brotherhood was founded by viticulturist of Malaga in the year 1615. The sculptures correspond to Jesus of Nazareth of Vineyards, Jesus carrying the cross, and the Virgin of the Transfer and Solitude.
Congregation of Mena (Congregación de Mena). It is one of the most popular brotherhoods, the Christ of Good Death is accompanied throughout the procession by the Spanish Legion while they sing El novio de la Muerte (The Bridegroom of Death). The image the Virgin of Solitude is carried on a second throne. It is one of the biggest and most covered of the processions, with full-blown media coverage given to the Legion and its veterans attending the rites.
Brotherhood of Mercy (Hermandad de la Misericordia). From the church of the Carmen In the neighborhood of El Perchel the Brotherhood of Our Father Jesus of the Mercy depicts Jesus' fall with the cross, and Our Lady of Great Power. The Procession is accompanied by the Spanish Air Force.
 Brotherhood of Zamarrilla (Hermandad de Zamarrilla). The Brotherhood of the Christ of Miracles, shows Jesus dying on the cross, and the Holy Mary of Amargura is known as Zamarilla due to the legend of brigand Zamarilla who fled from the guards he hid under the cape of the Virgin getting to escape, as gratitude he placed to the Virgin a white rose which turned red. Since then, the Virgin's image carries a red rose on her chest and is known as the Virgin of Zamarrilla.
Archconfraternity of Hope (Archicofradía de la Esperanza).  This brotherhood, which dates back to the 16th century, is one of the most popular of Holy Week. The Walking Nazarene image on the first throne, the work of Mariano Benlliure, shows Jesus carrying the cross and every year makes the blessing to the people of Malaga in the Constitution Square. The Virgin of Hope is a work of the 17th century attributed to Pedro de Mena is carried on one of the largest and heaviest thrones. During the procession a carpet of rosemary covers the streets where it goes.
Christ of the True Cross (Cristo de la Vera Cruz). Belonging to the Royal Merged Brotherhood, the Christ of the True Cross is the oldest brotherhood of the city, dated in the 16th century. Its silent procession, the last of the night, is a unique feature of the festivities.

Good Friday 
The cofradías that participate in this day usually are cofradías showing the seriousness of the occasion being marked.

Archconfraternity of Sorrows of San Juan (Archicofradía de Dolores de San Juan). From the Church of San Juan leaves the Brotherhood of the Christ of Redemption, with their images representing Jesus dying on the cross and Virgin of the Sorrows. Each throne is accompanied by a musical chapel, basically a wind chamber ensemble.
Brotherhood of Mount Calvary (Hermandad del Monte Calvario). This brotherhood begins from the Shrine of Victory, the first throne shows the moment Jesus' body is wrapped with shroud.
Brotherhood of Descent (Hermandad del Descendimiento). The first throne represents the descent of Christ from the cross, being a sculpture of Luis Ortega Bru. The second throne carries the image of the Virgen of the Anguish. It has its location in the Hospital Noble next to the bullring La Malagueta.
 Brotherhood of the Holy Transport (Hermandad del Santo Traslado).  Departs from the neighborhood of La Trinidad. The first throne represents the transfer of Christ to the Sepulchre. In the second there is the statue of the Virgin of the Solitude, one of the few virgins that do not go under canopy but she appears kneeling at the foot of the cross.
 Brotherhood of Love  (Hermandad del Amor). This procession starts from the neighborhood of Victory, formed by the Christ of Love, Christ died on the cross dated in the 18th century, and the Virgin of Charity.
 Brotherhood of Pieta  (Hermandad de la Piedad). The Brotherhood of Pieta shows the Virgin Mary cradling the dead body of Jesus, after the descent. Coming from the neighborhood of El Molinillo, this brotherhood only has a throne.
 Brotherhood of the Holy Sepulchre (Hermandad del Santo Sepulcro). It is the official brotherhood of the city for that reason in the procession the members of the local government participate. In the first throne shows Jesus dead in the Sepulchre, the sculpture is carried on a magnificent catafalque designed by José Moreno Carbonero and completed by local artist Félix Granda in 1926. Traditionally, the funeral march of Chopin is played whenever this brotherhood marches. In the second throne, stationed behind the Holy Sepulchre, is the image of Virgin of the Solitude, in mourning clothes. As it is the official brotherhood of Malaga, it is one of the more covered, with the Mayor of Malaga usually joining the brotherhood leading members of the City Council.
 Servite Order (Ordén de Servitas). It has the privilege of closing the processions of Good Friday. The image of the Virgin of Sorrows, a work of Fernando Ortiz of the 18th century, is carried on the smallest throne of Holy Week. All street lights are turned off from the streets where the procession goes.

Easter Sunday
The procession of the Resurrection of Jesus and the Virgin Queen of the Heaven is the last procession of Holy Week. This procession is organized by the Brotherhoods Association and in it all the brotherhoods attend. The floats depict the meeting of Jesus and his Mother after He had been raised from the dead. Their presence signals the end of Holy Week celebrations in this city.

See also 
Holy Week
Holy Week in Spain
Fiestas of International Tourist Interest of Spain

References

External links 

 Page of Holy Week of the department of Tourism of Málaga 
 Page about the Holy Week in Málaga
 Easter in Málaga 
 Agrupación de Semana Santa de Málaga 

Málaga
Festivals in Spain
Málaga
Andalusian culture